Louis John Rooney (born 28 September 1996) is a former professional footballer who last played as a striker for Truro City.

Career

Plymouth Argyle
Born in Plymouth, England, Rooney joined the Plymouth Argyle academy at age 9 and progressed throughout the ranks.

After helping the club's U18 side win the Football League Youth Alliance Merit League One, Rooney signed his first professional contract with Argyle in June 2015 at the age of 18. In addition, Rooney was awarded the Richard Phillips Trophy for "his ability, sportsmanship, work-rate, dedication and improvement".

In the 2015–16 season, Rooney was promoted to Plymouth Argyle's first team and in the club's pre-season tour, he scored two hat-tricks against Tavistock and Saltash United However, Rooney spent the rest of season at the first team at the substitute bench, with Reuben Reid, Jake Jervis, Deane Smalley, Craig Tanner and Ryan Brunt preferred instead. At one point, he was expected to be loaned out However, the attempts was unsuccessful and stayed throughout the season. He made his professional debut in Argyle's final game of their 2015–16 League 2 season against Hartlepool. He marked his debut with two goals in a 5–0 victory, including a 25-yard strike which won the club's 'Goal of the season' competition and was awarded with a new contract.

In the 2016–17 season, Rooney continued to remain in the first team since the start of the season and was overlooked, citing competitions. After his loan spell at Truro City came to an end, in which he suffered a hamstring injury, Rooney made his first appearance of the 2016–17 season, coming on as a second-half substitute, in a 3–0 loss against Grimsby Town on 19 November 2016. Once again, Rooney spent the next two months on the substitute bench and was expected to be loaned out once more. Upon returning to his parent club at the end of the 2016–17 season, Rooney was released by the club. Upon learning his release, Rooney stated that he felt leaving the club was for him to "make his name somewhere".

Loan spells
In September 2016, he spent time on loan to National League South club Truro City. Rooney made his Truro City debut the next day, playing the whole game, in a 2–1 win over Wealdstone. After extending his loan spell until January 2017, Rooney scored his first Truro City goal, in a 2–2 draw against Eastbourne Borough on 22 October 2016. After scoring two more goals for the side, Rooney's time at Truro came to an end and returned to his parent club in November 2016 after suffering a hamstring during a match against St Albans City.

Rooney joined Hartlepool United on loan until the end of the 16/17 season, with the loan transfer being approved within the last minute of the January transfer window. He won the man of the match award on his Pools debut, a 1–1 draw with Yeovil Town. Several weeks later after making his debut, Rooney set up one of the goals, in a 2–1 loss against Colchester United. Although he went on to make seven appearances, Rooney played the rest of the seven matches as a substitute. At the end of the 2016–17 season, he returned to his parent club.

International career

Though he was born in Plymouth, England, Rooney is eligible to play for Northern Ireland through his father, who was born in Belfast. In March 2014, Rooney was called up by Northern Ireland at under-19 for the first time. On the same month, he made his Northern Ireland U19 debut against Switzerland U19. Rooney went on to make two appearances for Northern Ireland U19 side.

Two years later, Rooney has represented under-21 levels after being called up in August 2016. He made his Northern Ireland U21 side on 2 September 2016, coming on as a second-half substitute, in a 1–0 loss against Iceland U21. Rooney went on to make two more appearances for the Northern Ireland U21 side.

Personal life 
Rooney's brother Daniel is a member of the Plymouth Argyle Under-18 squad and Northern Ireland Under-19 squad.

Growing up in Plymouth, England, Louis attended South East Cornwall Schools at both primary and secondary levels and then Torpoint Community College.

Rooney now works for GSL Education in Plymouth.

References 

1996 births
Living people
Footballers from Plymouth, Devon
English footballers
Northern Ireland youth international footballers
Northern Ireland under-21 international footballers
Association football forwards
Plymouth Argyle F.C. players
Hartlepool United F.C. players
Truro City F.C. players
English Football League players
National League (English football) players
English people of Northern Ireland descent
Linfield F.C. players